Gajibiji is a 2008 Telugu film directed, written, and produced by K. Vasu. Ali plays the lead role while Farjana, Venu Madhav, Brahmanandam, Krishna Bhagavaan, Kota Srinivasa Rao and Raghu Babu play supporting roles. This film released on 8 August 2008.

Cast
 Ali
 Farjana
 Yeshwant
 Krishna Bhagavaan
 Venu Madhav
 Brahmanandam
 Kota Srinivasa Rao
 Raghu Babu

References

External links
 

2008 films
2008 comedy films
2000s Telugu-language films
Indian comedy films
Films directed by K. Vasu